The Martyrs of Sigum were a group of Nicomedians who were arrested and worked to death around 257 in the marble quarries of Sigum, Numidia, during the persecution of the Christians initiated by the Roman emperor Valerian (r. 253–260). 
They were recognized as saints, with a feast day of 10 September.

Ramsgate account

The monks of Ramsgate wrote in 1921,

Butler's account

The hagiographer Alban Butler names the martyrs as Nemesianus, Felix, Lucius, another Felix, Litteus, Polianus, Victor, Jader, and Dativus, and Others.
He wrote, 

Butler goes on to quote the lengthy letter from Saint Cyprian, in which he praises them for their courage and encourages them to look forward to their reward in heaven.

Notes

Sources

Numidian saints
257 deaths